Solymosi is a Hungarian surname. It is the surname of:
Balázs Solymosi, head of Wood Badge training in Hungary
Ernő Solymosi (1940–2011), Hungarian footballer
Eszter Solymosi, 19th century girl in Austria-Hungary whose death led to the Tiszaeszlár affair
Gabor Solymosi, Hungarian competitor in the 2012 World Cup of Pool
József Solymosi, Hungarian-Canadian mathematician
Otto Solymosi (born 1927), director of Magyar Rádió
Zoltán Solymosi (born 1967), Hungarian ballet dancer

See also
Avrămești, a commune in Romania one of whose villages has the Hungarian name Solymosi Láz